Burrard may refer to:

People
 Burrard baronets
 Sir George Burrard, 3rd Baronet (1769–1856)
 Sir George Burrard, 4th Baronet (1805–1870)
 Sir Harry Burrard, 1st Baronet, of Lymington (1755-1813), a British General
 Sir Harry Burrard, 1st Baronet, of Walhampton (1707-1791)
 Sir Harry Burrard-Neale, 2nd Baronet, of Walhampton (1765-1840)
 Sir Sidney Burrard, 7th Baronet (1860–1943)
 Will Burrard-Lucas (born 1983), British wildlife photographer and entrepreneur
 George Burrard (disambiguation), a number of people named George Burrard
 Harry Burrard (disambiguation), a number of people named Harry Burrard
 John Burrard (1646–1698), British politician, who sat in the House of Commons for Lymington from 1679 to 1698
 Paul Burrard (1678–1735), British politician who sat in the House of Commons between 1705 and 1735
 Sidney Gerald Burrard (1860–1943), British army officer who served as Surveyor General of India

Places in British Columbia
 Burrard Inlet, an inlet in Vancouver, named after Harry Burrard-Neale
 Burrard Peninsula, peninsula in the Lower Mainland region of southwestern British Columbia, Canada
 Burrard (electoral district) (1896–1904, 1917–1925), a federal electoral district
 Vancouver-Burrard, a provincial electoral district
 Burrard Street, Vancouver
 Burrard Bridge, Vancouver
 Burrard station, a station on Vancouver's SkyTrain system
 Burrard Dry Dock, a shipyard in North Vancouver
 Burrard Generating Station, was a natural gas-fired station in Port Moody, British Columbia

Others
 Burrard Band or Tsleil-Waututh First Nation, a First Nations government
 Maple Ridge Burrards, Senior Lacrosse Club, competing in the Western Lacrosse Association.
 Vancouver Burrards, Senior Lacrosse Club, the name of several lacrosse teams in Vancouver, British Columbia